The lower part of the external hemorrhoidal plexus is drained by the inferior rectal veins (or inferior hemorrhoidal veins) into the internal pudendal vein.

Pathologies involving the Inferior rectal veins may cause lower GI bleeding. Depending on the degree of inflammation, they are given a grade level ranging from 1 through 4.

Additional images

References

Veins of the torso